The 2016–17 Third League (known as the Spor Toto 3. Lig for sponsorship reasons) is the 16th season of the league since its establishment in 2001 as the fourth level division; and the 46th season of the third league in Turkish football since its establishment in 1967–68.

Group 1

League table

Promotion Playoffs

Semifinals

Finals

Group 2

League table

Promotion Playoffs

Semifinals

Finals

Group 3

League table

Promotion Playoffs

Semifinals

Finals

See also 
 2016–17 Turkish Cup
 2016–17 Süper Lig
 2016–17 TFF First League
 2016–17 TFF Second League

References

External links

4
Turk
TFF Third League seasons